Go West are an English pop duo, formed in 1982 by lead vocalist Peter Cox and rhythm guitarist and backing  vocalist Richard Drummie. At the 1986 Brit Awards, they received the Brit Award for British Breakthrough Act. The duo enjoyed popularity between the mid-1980s and the early 1990s and are best known for the international top 10 hits "We Close Our Eyes", "Call Me", "Faithful", and "King of Wishful Thinking"; the last was featured in the 1990 film Pretty Woman.

History
In 1982, Cox and Drummie formed the band Go West, with Cox as lead singer and Drummie on guitar and backing vocals. Go West had a publishing deal and possessed a portastudio, but lacked a band or recording company. Cox and Drummie decided, with support from John Glover, their manager, to find a musical producer, and record just two of their songs. The tracks "We Close Our Eyes" and "Call Me" found Go West landing a recording contract with Chrysalis Records.

Go West's debut single, "We Close Our Eyes", was released in 1985 and reached No. 5 on the UK Singles Chart, No. 5 on the US Dance Club Play chart and No. 41 on the Billboard Hot 100. The video for the song, directed by Godley & Creme, was innovative and unusual for its time, becoming an early favourite on MTV. "We Close Our Eyes" would prove to be the band's highest-placed UK single, and their only appearance in the UK Singles Chart's top ten.

The duo's eponymous debut album was released in 1985. It included "We Close Our Eyes" and "Call Me" as well as "Don't Look Down", which served as the prequel to what would be their first top 40 hit in the US. The album peaked at no. 8 in the United Kingdom. Bangs and Crashes, an album of remixes, B-sides and live tracks, was released in 1986, and included the track "One Way Street" which was part of the Rocky IV soundtrack. Go West were voted "Best Newcomer" at the 1986 Brit Awards.

In 1987, Go West released the proper follow-up to their debut album, Dancing on the Couch, which made the UK top 20. Although several singles were released, the album was not as commercially successful as their first, particularly in the United States. However, it yielded the band's first American top 40 hit single: "Don't Look Down – The Sequel".

In 1990, Go West had a no. 8 hit in the U.S. with "King of Wishful Thinking" from the film Pretty Woman. Written by Cox and Drummie in collaboration with Martin Page, the song received an ASCAP award.

In 1992, the duo released the Indian Summer album, which included "Faithful". Written by the band and Martin Page and produced by Peter Wolf, the song reached the top 20 in the UK, Canada and the United States.

Cox and Drummie appeared on Jim'll Fix It: Strikes Again in 2007, to re-create a popular 'fix-it' from 1986; in the original show, a fifteen-year-old girl had sung "We Close Our Eyes" with Go West as a backup singer.

In November 2015, a compilation album called 80's Re:Covered featured two Go West covers of The Killers' "Human", including a remix, while a recording of a 2003 concert recorded at the Robin 2 in Bilston was released as Live Robin 2 – 2003 CD/DVD in 2016. The concert was previously released as the live DVD Kings of Wishful Thinking – Live in 2004.

Awards and nominations
{| class=wikitable
|-
! Year !! Awards !! Category !! Work !! Result !! Ref. 
|-
| 1986
| Pollstar Concert Industry Awards
| Next Major Arena Headliner
| Themselves
| 
| 
|-
| 1991
| Brit Awards
| British Video of the Year
| rowspan=2|"King of Wishful Thinking"
| 
| 
|-
| 1992
| rowspan=2|ASCAP Pop Music Awards
| rowspan=2|Most Performed Songs
| 
| 
|-
| 1994
| "Faithful"
| 
|

Members
Peter Cox – lead vocals, keyboards
Richard Drummie – electric guitars, keyboards, backing vocals

Discography

Studio albums

Live albums
The Best of Go West: Live at the NEC (2001)
Tony Hadley v Peter Cox & Go West (with Tony Hadley) (2004)
Live Robin 2 – 2003 (2016)

Compilation albums
Aces and Kings – The Best of Go West (1993) (BPI: Gold)
The Best of Go West (1998)
The Best Of (1998)
The Very Best of Go West (2012)

Remix albums

Extended plays
3D Part 1 (2010)
3D Part 2 (2011)
3D Part 3 (2013)

Singles

References

External links
Official Go West Website and Forum
Peter Cox interviewed by Kevin Gurney from 96.5 Bolton FM

English pop music duos
British soul musical groups
Male musical duos
Brit Award winners
Musical groups from London
Chrysalis Records artists
Sophisti-pop musical groups